The Classis Misenensis ("Fleet of Misenum"), later awarded the honorifics praetoria and Pia Vindex, was the senior fleet of the imperial Roman navy.

History 

The  was founded by Caesar Augustus in 27 BCE, when the fleet of Italy, until then based mostly at Ostia, was moved to the new harbour of Portus Julius at Misenum in the Bay of Naples.

The  recruited its crews mostly from the East, especially from Egypt. Since Rome did not face any naval threat in the Mediterranean, the bulk of the fleet's crews were idle. Some of the sailors were based in Rome itself, initially housed in the barracks of the Praetorian Guard, but later given their own barracks, the  near the Colosseum. There they were used to stage mock naval battles, and operated the mechanism that deployed the canvas canopy of the Colosseum.

In 192, the Misenum fleet supported Didius Julianus, and then participated in the campaign of Septimius Severus against Pescennius Niger, transporting his legions to the East. The fleet remained active in the East for the next few decades, where the emergence of the Persian Sassanid Empire posed a new threat.

In 324 the fleet's ships participated in the campaign of Constantine the Great against Licinius and his decisive naval victory in the Battle of the Hellespont. Afterwards, the bulk of the ships were moved to Constantinople, Constantine's new capital.

Praefecti classis Misenensis 
The following list is based on Werner Eck and Hans Lieb, "Ein Diplom für die Classis Ravennas vom 22. November 206", Zeitschrift für Papyrologie und Epigraphik, 96 (1993), pp. 86–88

List of known ships 
The following ship names and types of the classis Misenensis have survived:
 1 hexeres: Ops
 1 quinquereme: Victoria
 9 quadriremes: Fides, Vesta, Venus, Minerva, Dacicus, Fortuna, Annona, Libertas, Olivus
 50 triremes: Concordia, Spes, Mercurius, Iuno, Neptunus, Asclepius, Hercules, Lucifer, Diana, Apollo, Venus, Perseus, Salus, Athenonix, Satyra, Rhenus, Libertas, Tigris, Oceanus, Cupidus, Victoria, Taurus, Augustus, Minerva, Parthicus, Euphrates, Vesta, Aesculapius, Pietas, Fides, Danubius, Ceres, Tibur, Pollux, Mars, Salvia, Triumphus, Aquila, Liber Pater, Nilus, Caper, Sol, Isis, Providentia, Fortuna, Iuppiter, Virtus, Castor
 11 liburnians: Aquila, Agathopus, Fides, Aesculapius, Iustitia, Virtus, Taurus Ruber, Nereis, Clementia, Armata, Minerva

By 79 this fleet had probably nothing larger than a quadrireme in service, for Pliny the Elder, commander of the fleet, investigated the eruption of Vesuvius in a quadrireme, presumably his flagship and the largest class of vessel in the fleet.

See also
 Roman navy

References

Sources
 
 

Misenensis
27 BC establishments
Military units and formations established in the 1st century BC
Military history of Naples